Waiariki is a New Zealand parliamentary Māori electorate that was established for the , replacing the Te Tai Rawhiti electorate. It is currently held by Māori Party co-leader Rawiri Waititi, who won it in the 2020 general election.

Waiariki was an important electorate in the 2020 election as Waititi's win allowed the Māori Party to re-enter parliament with two MPs, despite not reaching the 5% party vote threshold needed for parties without an electorate seat.

Population centres
The electorate includes the following population centres:
 Tauranga
 Whakatāne
 Rotorua
 Taupō

In the 2013/14 redistribution, a minor boundary adjustment was undertaken. A small area, including the village of Tuia, was transferred to Waiariki from the  electorate.

Tribal areas
The electorate includes the following tribal areas:
 Waitaha-Nui-ā-Hei
Ngāti Ranginui
Ngāi Te Rangi
Te Arawa
Ngāti Awa
Ngāi Tūhoe
Whakatōhea
Ngāi Tai
Te Whānau-ā-Apanui
Ngāti Kahungunu ki Wairoa
Ngāti Tūwharetoa

History
The first representative was Mita Ririnui of the Labour Party, with Tuariki Delamere (Te Tawharau) coming second, Arapeta Tahana (Alliance) coming third and Kahukore Baker (New Zealand First) coming fourth.

Rihi Vercoe and Hamuera Mitchell of Mana Māori and the National Party came second and third, respectively.

Hawea Vercoe of Destiny New Zealand came a distant third. The  was contested by two contenders: the incumbent and Ririnui. Flavell was once again confirmed.

The  was contested by three contenders: Flavell, Annette Sykes of the Mana Party and Louis Te Kani of the Labour Party. Flavell had a comfortable lead over Sykes, with Te Kani coming third.

This left the Māori Party without any electorate seats, and consequently, no parliamentary representation as they had not reached the 5% party vote threshold required to enter Parliament without winning an electorate.

Members of Parliament
Key

List MPs
Members of Parliament elected from party lists in elections where that person also unsuccessfully contested the Waiariki electorate. Unless otherwise stated, all MPs terms began and ended at general elections.

Election results

2020 election

2017 election

2014 election

2011 election

Electorate (as at 26 November 2011): 33,240

2008 election

2005 election

2002 election

 
 
 
 
 

1 United Future swing is compared to 1999 results from both United NZ and Future NZ combined, as the two merged in 2000.

1999 election

Notes

References

Māori electorates
1999 establishments in New Zealand